This is a list of muffler men, large moulded fiberglass advertising icons.

Arizona
Louie The Lumberjack at Northern Arizona University in Flagstaff
Paul Bunyan at Leo's Auto and Home Supply/Don's Hot Rod Shop in Tucson
Big Ed at Cumming's Plumbing in Tucson
Big Johnson (B.J.) at Big Johnson's Store in Prescott

California
"Big Bert", River Bend Resort, Forestville.
"Big Josh" in Joshua Tree (formerly "Mecca Man" at El Tompa Mini Mart in Mecca).

"Big Mike", formerly at Big Mike's Muffler, Hayward
"Babe Royer" at Babe's Lightning & Muffler in San Jose.
Chicken Boy in Highland Park
"El Salsero" Muffler Man at 22800 Pacific Coast Highway, Malibu
"Edwin", a golfer, at El Monte Sign Company, 2710 Santa Anita Avenue
"The Guy," a race car driver holding a checkered flag, off the 405 freeway, at the west coast Porsche Experience Center in Carson. Originally a golfer for the Dominguez Golf Course
Unnamed, King's Auto Repair in Compton
"Sergio," at Automotive Alley in Boyle Heights
"Tony" at Tony's Transmissions in City Terrace
"Kevin" at Tuneup Masters in Van Nuys
"Joor Muffler Man" at Joor Muffler in Escondido
"The Indian Warrior" at Ethels Old Corral in Bakersfield
”Rodeo Man” in Livermore

Colorado
"Trailer Park Cowboy" at Rustic Ranch Mobile Home Park, 5565 Federal Blvd., Denver.
"Ranch Cowboy" stands guard with a pitchfork at Lazy T Ranch, 12765 N. 63rd St., Longmont.
"Greeley Muffler Man" in front of Just Bob's Auto, 500 1st Ave, Greeley.

Connecticut
When the 26-foot "Muffler Man" Paul Bunyan was erected in front of a Cheshire lumber business in the 1980s, the town objected to the statue, citing that it was a violation of town codes given its substantial height.  Finding no limitation on flagpole height on the books, the owners of the statue replaced Bunyan's axe with an American flag.

Norwich- West Main Street
Big Bob, a wayward Connecticut cowboy, has been in Norwich since the mid-1960s. For his first 20 years he was on the other side of town. Back then he belonged to Alex Cohen, who used the Muffler Man to draw visitors to his amusement park. That business eventually closed, and when the owners of Surplus Unlimited—who were friends with Al—opened their store in 1982, they bought Big Bob. They had admired him ever since they were kids.

Patriotic Big Bob has held an American flag since his move, and is anchored with cables to the front of the store to prevent people from climbing onto the roof and kicking him over (It's been attempted). At night he is illuminated by a spotlight. Surplus Unlimited keeps Big Bob in good repair, featuring him in its advertising and as artwork on the side of its delivery truck in the parking lot.

Florida 

 In front of CSD Truck Repairs in Palm River-Clair Mel
In front of Aufo Air Muffler & Brake City in Dade City

Kansas 

 Muffler Man in front of Brown's Tire in Wichita.

Indiana 
MacAllister Rental outside of Muncie, In. A Paul Bunyan stands outside the main building, looking at Interstate 69 
https://www.macallisterrentals.com/about/locations/muncie-equipment-rental/

Idaho
The World's Largest Janitor, "Big Don", at the Museum of Clean in Pocatello.

The "lumberjack" at Heyburn Elementary School in St. Maries.

Illinois
Gemini Giant in Wilmington
A Giant Hot Dog Statue on Route 66 in Atlanta, Illinois was relocated from Bunyon's in Cicero upon that restaurateur's retirement.
 Lauterbach Man at Lauterbach Service Center in Springfield
 Spartan at Southeast High School in Springfield
 BIG FAT in Evergreen Park, Paul Bunyan statue on top of Guardian Auto Re-builders
 Blind Without Glasses at 6300 S. Pulaski in Chicago, Indian on top of an eye clinic
 Paul Bunyan at Lamb's Farm in Libertyville.
 2 muffler men, Paul Bunyan and Beach Boy, at the Pink Elephant Antique Mall in Livingston
 Stogie Man at Cigars and Stripes in Berwyn

Iowa
 Giant "Phil", Williamsburg. A Phillips 66 Cowboy, Muffler Man, once stood at the Landmark Truck Stop in Williamsburg, at the intersection of I80 and IA-149. It appears on a vintage postcard and possibly now stands with a large fiberglass bull in Waukon.

Louisiana 

In front of Topps Western World, 3003 Topps Trail, Bossier City (facing I-20, near exit 23).

Massachusetts 

Plantation Man, Chicopee.  It was originally made for a restaurant in Framingham, then as Uncle Sam for a car dealership in Springfield.  It is currently being auctioned and its future is uncertain.
There is a Muffler Man with a large ax and lumberman's hard hat at the entrance to Valley Tree Service on the east side of Route 97 in Groveland.
A Muffler Man depicted in rural attire and baseball cap stands at Green Valley Equipment Company, on Route 43 in Hancock.

Michigan
Greg E. Normous:  Golfer, stands at a putt putt golf course, named for Greg Norman, 23 Mile Road, New Baltimore.
Golf Giant:  Golfer at driving range, 1/2 mile west of Greg E. Normous, New Baltimore.

Missouri 
 Bunyan (a Mr. Bendo): Stones Last Resort, Cleveland
 Bunyan (no job too big): Skyline Motors Tractor Trailer Repair, Foristell
 Injun Joe and Country Bumpkin: Bagnell Dam Strip, Lake Ozark
 Muffler Man: Chief Wappalese: Chaonia Landing Resort and Marina, Lake Wappapello
 Cowboy Muffler Man (In Pieces): Croft Automotive and Trailer, Valley Park
 Muffler Man (custom designed as a chef and erected in 2020) Route 66 Food-Truck Park, Springfield
 Mega Major: Opposite Uranus Fudge Factory, 14400 Hwy Z, St Robert

Montana 
There is a Muffler Man in front of the tire store on Montana Ave. in Billings.

Casino Dude Muffler Man at Fort Rockvale Restaurant and Casino in Joliet
Muffler Man at Plentywood

Nebraska 
"Indian" in the stockade behind Fort Cody Trading Post has been a fixture along I-80 for decades at North Platte, exit 177.

New Jersey
Nitro Girl - Black Horse Pike, Blackwood
Carpet Viking Statue, Route 77, Deerfield
Muffler man collection - Halfwit, Halfwit head paintball target, Dracula head, Monmoth Road, Holmeston
Carpet-clutching Muffler Man, Broadway, Jersey City
Tire Man in Pink - White Horse Pike, Magnolia
Pirate, Boardwalk, Ocean City
Barnacle Bill's Amusements, Highway 35, Ortley Beach
Muffler Man collection, Ocean Terrace, Seaside Heights
Happy Halfwit, Highway 73, Winslow
Cowtown Rodeo, Highway 40, Woodstown

New Mexico

Sun Glass, Farmington
Big Daddy's Flea Market, Las Cruces
Franciscan RV Inc., Hatch
John's Used Cars, Gallup (cowboy Muffler Man)

New York
 Gas station in Westchester County 135 N Saw Mill River Road, Elmsford (yellow shirt, green pants)Muffler man
 Mountain Air Campground 1265 Lake Ave, Lake Luzerne (red shirt, blue pants)
 Camp Bullowa Boy Scout Camp, Rockland County (classic Paul Bunyan, red shirt with blue pants and ax)

North Carolina
Bradsher Landscape Supply, Raleigh (blue jeans and baseball cap)

 Harry's On The Hill Cadillac GMC, Asheville (Chief Pontiac)
 Paul Bunyan holding an axe, with Babe the Blue Ox, Original Log Cabin Company, Rocky Mount
 White's Tire Company, Wilson

North Dakota
 Chieftain Motel, Carrington (figure is a Native American with upraised arm)

Oklahoma
 Buck Atom the Space Cowboy, Tulsa
 Native American with arm stretched out at Indian Trading Post in Calumet

Oregon
Harvey the Giant Rabbit in Reedville

Pennsylvania
Cadet Restaurant, Kittanning
Lugnutz Tire Service, Greensburg
The Inside Scoop ice cream shop in Coopersburg
 Muffler Man at Mr. Tire, Uniontown

South Dakota
Automotive Brake & Exhaust, Sioux Falls - 'Mr. Bendo', arm upraised if holding an exhaust pipe in one hand
Full Throttle Saloon (new location), 'Windover Willie' originally from Winnemucca, Neveada. Located at 19942 Hwy 79, Vale - Cowboy holding a cigar in his left hand and a mug of beer in his right.

Texas

Red McCombs Big Chief in downtown San Antonio
Mr. Bendo, Paul Bunyan, at San Angelo
Glenn Goode and Mary Jean Goode's "Big People!": Cowboy, two Big Johns and a Uniroyal Gal in Gainesville
Happy The Halfwit at Kenn's Muffler Shop in Beaumont
2nd Amendment Cowboy at Cadillac RV Park in Amarillo
at Wine Garage, east of Fredericksburg on US-290

Tennessee

Native American in Chinos - Beside Sad Sam's at Exit 112 off of I-65, near Cross Plains. 
Pal's, Kingsport - Man carrying a hamburger
Pratt's, Kingsport - Indian in loincloth
Muffler Man at Four Way Mufflers & Motors, 1368 E Broadway, Gallatin

Utah
 "Big John", a coal miner on South Main Street in front of the Helper Civic Auditorium and city library (formerly the city hall) in Helper
 "Mr. Spock," a muffler man repainted to resemble the Mr. Spock sits atop a business in Salt Lake City

Virginia

Chincoteague Viking, Chincoteague Island
Auto Muffler King at 5835 Jefferson Avenue in Newport News
Williamson Road Service Center at 3110 Williamson Road, Roanoke
Coeburn Red Oak Trading Company.

Washington 
 Paul Bunyan, Shelton
 One on roof of SSA Marine building, 1105 Hewitt Avenue, Everett
 22-foot cowboy muffler man on Highway 12, lower east Pomeroy

Wisconsin
Gus's Drive-In, East Troy - Gus's Giant  

Bulik's Amusement Center, Spooner - Cowboy
Fasco Appliance, Oshkosh- Paul Bunyan

References

External links

"Muffler Men" at Roadside America website
"Muffler Men tracker" at Roadside America Website
http://www.thurstontalk.com/2014/03/09/shelton-paul-bunyan/

Fiberglass sculptures
Lists of buildings and structures in the United States
Lists of public art in the United States
Roadside attractions in the United States
Transport culture
Advertising-related lists